Thudhamma Nikaya (also spelt Sudhammā Nikāya) is the largest monastic order of monks in Burma. 

It is one of 9 legally sanctioned monastic orders (nikāya) in the country, under the 1990 Law Concerning Sangha Organizations. Thudhamma is considered a more pragmatic order than the Shwegyin Nikaya, with looser rules regarding Vinaya regulations and is less hierarchical than the former. Like all the major orders in Burma, Thudhamma Nikaya prohibits monks from engaging in political activity.

Statistics

According to 2016 statistics published by the State Sangha Maha Nayaka Committee, 467,025 monks belonged to this monastic order, representing 87% of all monks in the country. With respect to geographic representation, the plurality of Thudhamma monks live in Mandalay Region (19.76%), followed by Shan State (16.09%), Yangon Region (15.39%), and Sagaing Region (9.88%).

Origins
Thudhamma Nikaya was founded in the late 18th century by King Bodawpaya, after a series of Sangha reforms by prior Konbaung kings to purify and unite the Sangha. The name 'Thudhamma' comes from the Thudhamma Council (an ecclesiastical organization founded by Bodawpaya),  which in turn is named after Mandalay's Thudhamma Zayats, the meeting grounds for the Council.

The office of the Supreme Patriarch ( or Thathanabaing), similar to the position of Sangharaja in Thailand and Cambodia, dates back to the 13th century, started by the monk Shin Arahan in the Pagan Kingdom. The Thathanabaing was responsible for managing the monastic hierarchy and education at monasteries. In 1784, King Bodawpaya assembled the Thudhamma Council, led by the Thathanapaing and four elders ( or thera) to resolve a longstanding issue on the proper wearing of monk's robes (whether one or both shoulders should be exposed). Toward the end of the Konbaung dynasty, the council, which oversaw religious affairs in the kingdom, including the appointment of monastery abbots, Vinaya regulations, discipline of individual monks, and administration of Pali examination, was expanded to include 8 elders.

References

See also
Shwegyin Nikaya
Hngettwin Nikaya
Dwara Nikaya
Nikaya
Buddhism in Burma

Theravada Buddhist orders
Schools of Buddhism founded in Myanmar